Capt. Kanwaljit Singh (1 September 1942 – 29 March 2009) was a Punjab Cooperation Minister and Shiromani Akali Dal's, General Secretary. He was a very respected and honest man. He was injured in a road accident near Kharar on 29 March 2009 and died at PGIMER Chandigarh on the same day.

Biography 

Kanwaljit Singh was born to Dara Singh in Nabha.

A former army captain (short service commission), Singh represented the Banur assembly segment in the Punjab assembly, and was elected a Member of Legislative Assembly (MLA) three times. He was one of the senior-most Akali leaders in the Parkash Singh Badal-led government, his first stint being as State Home Minister in the then Surjit Singh Barnala Ministry in the 1980s.

At the time of his death, he was in charge of the Cooperation, Defence Service Welfare, Removal of Grievances, Pensions & Welfare of Pensioners Wing of the Finance Department.

Positions held 
 Cabinet minister (Cooperation, Defence Service Welfare, Removal of Grievances, Pensions & Welfare of Pensioners Wing of the Finance Department)
 Minister for Finance and Planning 
 Minister of State for Home Affairs
 Vice-Chairman, Punjab State Planning Board
 Chairman, Empowered Committee to facilitate the growth of social and economic infrastructure
 Member, Empowered Committee of State Finance Ministers
 Vice-Chairman, Punjab Infrastructure Development Board

Personal life 
His son Jasjit Singh Bunny resigned from  primary membership of Shiromani Akali Dal on 3 April 2009 and announced his decision to contest as an Independent from the Patiala Lok Sabha constituency.

Bunny also resigned as chairman of the Punjab Cooperative Bank, a post which he got by virtue of his father being the cooperation minister, despite losing the 2007 Assembly election from Kharar.

It was speculated that Sukhbir Singh Badal's statement that, "there was no need to make any further adjustment for Bunny" was responsible for Bunny's sudden outburst.

References

External links 
 Question Asked By Kanwaljit Singh, Captain. Punjab Assembly website.

1942 births
2009 deaths
Road incident deaths in India
Indian Sikhs
People from Punjab, India
Members of the Punjab Legislative Assembly
Shiromani Akali Dal politicians
State cabinet ministers of Punjab, India
Accidental deaths in India